Johann Sebastian Bach composed the church cantata  (What God does is well done), 98, in Leipzig for the 21st Sunday after Trinity and first performed it on 10 November 1726.

History and words 
In his fourth year in Leipzig, Bach wrote the cantata for the 21st Sunday after Trinity. The prescribed readings for the Sunday were from Paul's Epistle to the Ephesians, "take unto you the whole armour of God", and from the Gospel of John, the healing of the nobleman's son. The cantata opens with the first stanza of the chorale "" (1674) by Samuel Rodigast, but it is not a chorale cantata in the strict sense of Bach's second cantata cycle, cantatas on the stanzas of one chorale.

The poet Christoph Birkmann refers to general ideas from the gospel. This final movement is not a chorale, although its text begins like one, Christian Keymann's "" (1658).

Bach first performed the cantata on 10 November 1726. It is regarded as part of his third cantata cycle.

Scoring and structure 
The cantata in five movements is intimately scored for four vocal soloists (soprano, alto, tenor and bass), a four-part choir, and a Baroque instrumental ensemble of two oboes, taille (tenor oboe), two violins, viola, and basso continuo.

 Chorus: 
 Recitative (tenor): 
 Aria (soprano): 
 Recitative (alto): 
 Aria (bass):

Music 
The cantata is scored like chamber music, especially compared to the chorale cantatas on the same chorale with a melody by Severus Gastorius. In the opening chorus, the mostly homophonic setting of the voices, with the oboes playing colla parte, is complemented by strings dominated by the first violin as an obbligato instrument rather than an independent orchestral concerto. The final line is in free polyphony, extended even during the long last note of the tune. All voices have extended melismas on the word "" (govern), stressing that God is "ultimately in control". Strings and voices alternate in the bar form's two Stollen, but are united for the Abgesang.

Both recitatives are secco. The first aria is accompanied by an obbligato oboe. The first two measures of its theme are derived from the chorale tune. The ritornello is repeated after a first vocal section, "cease weeping and remain patient", and a second time, concluding a different vocal section, which renders "God's resoluteness" in a stream of triplets in the voice. The second aria is the final movement, dominated by the violins in unison in a similar structure as the first, two vocal sections framed by repeats of a ritornello. Bach hints at the regular closing chorale by beginning the vocal part with an embellished version of the first line of the hymn "" on a melody by Andreas Hammerschmidt on the same words as the cantata text. The first line appears in four of five entries of the voice.

Recordings 
 Les Grandes Cantates de J. S. Bach Vol. 14, Fritz Werner, Heinrich-Schütz-Chor Heilbronn, Pforzheim Chamber Orchestra, Agnes Giebel, Claudia Hellmann, Helmut Krebs, Erich Wenk, Erato 1963
 J. S. Bach: Das Kantatenwerk – Sacred Cantatas Vol. 5, Gustav Leonhardt, Knabenchor Hannover, Leonhardt-Consort, soloist of the Knabenchor Hannover, Paul Esswood, Kurt Equiluz, Max van Egmond, Telefunken 1979
 Die Bach Kantate Vol. 55, Helmuth Rilling, Gächinger Kantorei, Bach-Collegium Stuttgart, Arleen Augér, Julia Hamari, Lutz-Michael Harder, Walter Heldwein, Hänssler 1983
 Bach Edition Vol. 5 – Cantatas Vol. 2, Pieter Jan Leusink, Holland Boys Choir, Netherlands Bach Collegium, Ruth Holton, Sytse Buwalda, Knut Schoch, Bas Ramselaar, Brilliant Classics 1999
 Bach Cantatas Vol. 11: Genova/Greenwich / For the 20th Sunday after Trinity / For the 21st Sunday after Trinity, John Eliot Gardiner, Monteverdi Choir, English Baroque Soloists, Joanne Lunn, William Towers, Paul Agnew, Gotthold Schwarz, Soli Deo Gloria 2000
 J. S. Bach: Complete Cantatas Vol. 18, Ton Koopman, Amsterdam Baroque Orchestra & Choir, Johannette Zomer, Bogna Bartosz, Christoph Prégardien, Klaus Mertens, Antoine Marchand 2003
 J. S. Bach: Cantatas for the Complete Liturgical Year Vol. 1: "Ich will den Kreuzstab gerne tragen" - Cantatas BWV 98 · 180 · 56 · 55, Sigiswald Kuijken, La Petite Bande, Sophie Karthäuser, Petra Noskaiová, Christoph Genz, Dominik Wörner, Accent 2004
 J. S. Bach: Cantatas Vol. 48 – Cantatas from Leipzig 1723, Masaaki Suzuki, Bach Collegium Japan, Hana Blažíková, Robin Blaze, Satoshi Mizukoshi, Peter Kooy, BIS 2010

References

Sources 
 
 Was Gott tut, das ist wohlgetan BWV 98; BC A 153 / Sacred cantata (21st Sunday after Trinity) Bach Digital
 Cantata BWV 98 Was Gott tut, das ist wohlgetan history, scoring, sources for text and music, translations to various languages, discography, discussion, Bach Cantatas Website
 BWV 98 Was Gott tut, das ist wohlgetan English translation, University of Vermont
 BWV 98 Was Gott tut, das ist wohlgetan text, scoring, University of Alberta

Church cantatas by Johann Sebastian Bach
1726 compositions